United Nations Security Council resolution 801, adopted without a vote on 8 January 1993, after examining the application of the Czech Republic for membership in the United Nations, the Council recommended to the General Assembly that the Czech Republic be admitted.

See also
 Member states of the United Nations
 List of United Nations Security Council Resolutions 801 to 900 (1993–1994)

References

External links
 
Text of the Resolution at undocs.org

 0801
1993 in the Czech Republic
 0801
 0801
January 1993 events